Yellow star-of-Bethlehem is a common name for several plants and may refer to:

Gagea lutea, a Eurasian flowering plant species in the family Liliaceae
Gagea pratensis, a European and Mediterranean plant species in the lily family